Stuart Russell may refer to:

 Stuart Russell (footballer) (1906–1978), Australian rules footballer
 Stuart Russell (politician) (1909–1943), British Conservative party politician, MP for Darwen 1935–1943
 Stuart J. Russell (born 1962), computer scientist known for his contributions to artificial intelligence
 J. Stuart Russell (1816–1895), pastor and author of The Parousia
 Nigel MacArthur, aka Stuart Russell, British DJ